Isael is a given name. It may refer to:

 Isael Villa Villa (born 1956), Mexican politician
 Isael Álvarez (born 1974), Cuban boxer
 Isael (footballer) (born 1988), Isael da Silva Barbosa, Brazilian football midfielder

See also
 Israel (name)